Renji Panicker (born 23 September 1960) is an Indian actor, scriptwriter, director, film producer, and journalist best known for his Malayalam films. He made his debut as a director with Bharatchandran IPS in 2005.

Early life 
He did his bachelor's degree in commerce from Sanatana Dharma College, Alappuzha and certificate in Journalism from Press Club, Thiruvananthapuram. He earned a master's degree in journalism from Kerala University, Karyavattom.

Career 
Panicker began his career as a journalist. He started off as a reporter for magazines and publications. During an interview, while working for Chithrabhumi, a film magazine, he met director Shaji Kailas. Renji scripted several films for Shaji Kailas, including Dr. Pasupathy (1990), Thalastaanam (1992), Sthalathe Pradhana Payyans (1993), Ekalavyan (1993), Mafia (1993), Commissioner (1994), and The King (1995). The Renji Panicker-Shaji Kailas team elevated Suresh Gopi into a bankable lead actor during the early 1990s. He is known for his collaboration with director Joshiy, which included the films Lelam (1997) and Pathram (1999). He became a film director and directed two films. He is one of the managing directors of the Malayalam newspaper Metrovaartha.

Renji has taken several cameo roles in his own films. However, he gained popularity as an actor for his role in Ohm Shanthi Oshaana (2014). He acted in Njaan (2014), Premam (2015), Jacobinte Swargarajyam (2016), Thoppil Joppan (2016), Alamara (2017), Godha (2017) and Bhayanakam (2018).

Personal life
Renji Panicker was married to Aneeta Mariam Thomas, his classmate at Kerala University. Aneeta died on 10 March 2019, suffering from a kidney ailment. They have twin sons, Nithin and Nikhil, and were living in Alappuzha before moving to Kochi.

Film career
While interviewing director Shaji Kailas, for a film magazine in 1990, he was impressed by Renji's language and asked him to do a script for him. Renji, who was an active politician since his college days tried out a political satire, Dr. Pasupathy, that turned out to be a hit. But the success of his debut film failed to bring recognition. His next venture Akashakottayile Sulthan, in 1991, directed by Jayaraj, with Sreenivasan in the main role, bombed. This made Renji to rethink film as a career. Upon Kailas' insistence, Renji made another attempt in 1992. Thalastaanam, revolving around campus politics was a hit and marked the beginning of the Shaji-Renji combination.

In the year 1993, Renji penned Sthalathe Pradhana Payyans. Directed by Kailas, this film was a turning point in the life of Jagadish, who was until then slotted into comic roles. Jagadish played the role of a common man who overnight becomes the home minister of the state. Sthalathe Pradhana Payyans completed 150 days in theatres, establishing Renji Panicker as one of the leading script writers in Malayalam cinema. Next was Ekalavyan, released in May 1993. Directed by Kailas, Ekalavyan was an action thriller revolving around the unholy nexus of drug mafia-godmen and politicians. Appearing in the lead role of a police officer, Suresh Gopi established himself as the next star of Malayalam cinema. Ekalavyan completed 150 days in most theatres. Mafia then revolved around Bangalore underworld. Directed by Kailas with Gopi as hero, it was released in 1993, making Renji the most expensive script-writer in Malayalam film.

In 1994, Kailas/Panicker created Commissioner, a police film, which completed a run of 200 days in theatres. Gopi appeared in the title role and the film became the biggest grosser of the year. Shaji/Renji rejoined in 1995, casting Mammootty as the hero of The King, which was released in the end of 1995 was successful. Thereafter the duo parted ways.

Renji, after a long time wrote a script for director Joshi in 1997. Lelam, another action thriller with Gopi as the hero was again a hit. The same team brought out Pathram the next year. Revolving around print media and the politics surrounding it, this flick is best remembered for dialog. The continuous run of hits came to an end in 2001. Renji's combination with Joshi, Dubai bombed. This was followed by Praja, the first time Mohanlal appeared in a Renji film and it completed 100 days in theatres. The back to back set backs forced Renji to take a break for three years. In 2005, he followed with Bharatchandran IPS the sequel of Commissioner, released in 1994. Bharatchandran IPS was his directorial debut. He also co-produced this film. This film crossed 100-day run in all major centres and gave a rebirth to Gopi. Renji's second directorial attempt was Roudram, released in 2008, with Mammootty in the main role, Another police story, this film was a box-office success. Renji's next project was The King & the Commissioner in which Mammootty and Gopi played the lead roles, Joseph Alex I.A.S. and Bharathchandran I.P.S., taken from the films The King and Commissioner. It was directed by Kailas. This film had many expectations, as Mammootty and Gopi were reuniting after many years as were Kailas and Panicker., it becomes a blockbuster and commercial success.

Plots and style
Panicker's dialogue in Lelam is based on a real-life character while the jingoistic and valorised protagonists in Commissioner (1994) and The King (1995) are considered timeless classics for Malayalam cinema.

Filmography

As an actor

Other works

Distribution

Television

Awards and nominations

Won
 FMB Minnale Film Award 2021– Best Actor (Male) for Kalamandalam Hyderali
 Madrid Imagineindia International Film Festival 2019 – Best Actor (Male) for Bhayanakam
 Indywood Academy Award for the Best Actor (Male) – Bhayanakam, 2018
 Kerala Film Critics Association Awards for Best Second Actor (Male) – Jacobinte Swargarajyam, 2017
 Asianet Comedy Awards for Star performer of the year – various films, 2017
 Asianet Film Awards for Best Supporting Actor – Jacobinte Swargarajyam, 2017
 South Indian International Movie Awards for Best Supporting Actor – Jacobinte Swargarajyam, 2017
 Asiavision Awards for Best Character Actor – Jacobinte Swargarajyam, 2016
 Nominations
 65th Filmfare Awards Southfor Filmfare Award for Best Supporting Actor – Malayalam- Godha, 2018
 2nd IIFA Utsavam for Best Supporting Actor – Jacobinte Swargarajyam, 2017
 64th Filmfare Awards South for Filmfare Award for Best Supporting Actor – Malayalam – Jacobinte Swargarajyam, 2017
 4th South Indian International Movie Awardsfor Best Supporting Actor – Ohm Shanthi Oshaana, 2015

References

External links
 

Living people
Male actors from Alappuzha
21st-century Indian film directors
20th-century Indian male actors
21st-century Indian male actors
Film directors from Kerala
Indian male film actors
Indian male screenwriters
Malayalam film directors
Malayalam screenwriters
Male actors in Malayalam cinema
People from Alappuzha district
Screenwriters from Kerala
1970 births